Peter Stöger (born 11 April 1966) is an Austrian football coach and a former player.

As a player Stöger won the Austrian championship 4 times, the cup 3 times. As a coach or sporting director Stöger won the Austrian championship 2 times and the cup 2 times, also won the promotion with 1. FC Köln, with 4 years his longest stint.

Club career
Stöger started his career at Favoritner AC Wien, and played six years for FK Austria Wien from 1988 through 1994, winning the league three years in a row, with players like Ralph Hasenhüttl.  After a year at FC Tirol Innsbruck, he joined SK Rapid Wien in 1995 and won a league title with them. He also played in the 1996 UEFA Cup Winners Cup Final against Paris St Germain in Brussels, which Rapid lost. He then returned to Austria after a year at LASK Linz and finished his career at 38 years of age with SC Untersiebenbrunn.

International career
He made his debut for Austria in February 1988 against Switzerland, missed out on the 1990 FIFA World Cup, but was a participant at the 1998 FIFA World Cup. He earned 65 caps, scoring 15 goals. His last international was a March 1999 friendly match, also against Switzerland.

Managerial career

Austria
Stöger, along with Frank Schinkels, became coach of Austria Wien on 6 May 2005 and was scheduled to end his role at the end of the season. However, Stöger continued in the position until December 2005, then became sporting director. After winning the championship in that season, the following season did not start well and both coach and manager were sacked before year's end. Stöger eventually moved for 3 years to First Vienna FC, then Grazer AK, and SC Wiener Neustadt. Stöger returned to manage Austria Wien on 30 May 2012, stayed for one year and celebrated the Austrian championship with a record number of points, despite Red Bull Salzburg investing much more money in Schmidt as coach, Mane, Alan, Soriano, Kampl as players.

1. FC Köln
Stöger and his co-trainer Manfred Schmid were bought out of their contracts for 700,000 EUR and a friendly, and thus started at 1. FC Köln on 11 June 2013.  A couple of weeks later, Köln signed Jörg Schmadtke as co-CEO. The Billy Goats continuously improved under their tenure, from 33 points in the first half in the 2. Bundesliga, to 35 points in the second half, followed by promotion. The next half in the German top-flight ended with 19 points, followed by 22 points. The first half of 2015/16 ended with 24 points. In January 2016, Stöger, along with his co-trainer Manfred Schmid, let his contract be extended to 2020, including a buy-out clause. During the second half of the season, Köln was not as good, with 19 points, but finished on a single-digit rank for the first time in 24 years. In the season 2016/17, Köln reached 26 and 23 points, and was on the lucky end of the congestion for the places which brought international football back into the city after 25 years. Cologne finished 5th and qualified for the Europa League. In the 2017/18 season, Köln's poor start was the worst ever start to a Bundesliga season, with only three points from the opening 14 matches. In October, Schmadtke resigned. After a win against Arsenal in the Europa League, a loss against Hertha and a draw against Schalke in the league, Schmidt and Stöger were sacked on 3 December 2017. Stöger was still supported by the fans and the team at the time; he came to a fundraising event for disabled kids the night after his dismissal.

Borussia Dortmund
On 10 December 2017, Stöger was contracted as successor to Peter Bosz to coach Borussia Dortmund until end of the season. Taking on this challenge a couple of days after leaving Köln, some colleagues found it a little hard to do. With BVB sitting eighth in the league table, Stöger stabilized the team, his squad including young players such as Manuel Akanji and Jadon Sancho, as well as Sergio Gómez. At the end of the season, BVB finished fourth, qualifying for the UEFA Champions League on the final matchday. He left Dortmund on 12 May 2018.

Return to Austria Wien
On 31 July 2020, Stöger returned as head coach of Austria Wien.

Move to Ferencváros
On 5 June 2021, Stöger signed as head coach for Hungarian side Ferencváros. Under his tenure, the team managed to get to the group stage of the UEFA Europa League, where they were drawn together with Bayer Leverkusen, Celtic and Real Betis. Ferencváros lost five of the six group stage games, finishing last in their group.  After suffering its first away loss domestically to newly-promoted Debreceni VSC, he was relieved of his duties by the club on 13 December 2021.

Career statistics

International

Scores and results list Austria's goal tally first, score column indicates score after each Stöger goal.

Managerial record

Honours

Player
Austria Wien
Austrian Football Bundesliga: 1990–91, 1991–92, 1992–93
Austrian Cup: 1989–90, 1991–92, 1993–94
Austrian Supercup: 1990, 1991, 1992, 1993

Rapid Wien
Austrian Football Bundesliga: 1995–96
UEFA Cup Winners' Cup: Runner–up 1995–96
Austrian Supercup: 1996

Manager
Austria Wien
Austrian Cup: 2004–05
Austrian Football Bundesliga: 2012–13

1. FC Köln
2. Liga : 2013–14

References

External links
Player profile - Austria Archive
Rapid stats - Rapid Archive

1966 births
Living people
Footballers from Vienna
Austrian footballers
Austria international footballers
1998 FIFA World Cup players
SK Vorwärts Steyr players
FK Austria Wien players
FC Tirol Innsbruck players
SK Rapid Wien players
LASK players
FC Admira Wacker Mödling players
Austrian Football Bundesliga players
SC Untersiebenbrunn players
FK Austria Wien managers
First Vienna FC managers
Grazer AK managers
SC Wiener Neustadt managers
Association football midfielders
Bundesliga managers
1. FC Köln managers
Borussia Dortmund managers
Austrian football managers
Austrian expatriate football managers
Expatriate football managers in Germany
Austrian expatriate sportspeople in Germany
Ferencvárosi TC managers
Nemzeti Bajnokság I managers
Expatriate football managers in Hungary
Austrian expatriate sportspeople in Hungary